Samar Dasht (also Romanized as S̄amar Dasht) is a village in Deh Chal Rural District, in the Central District of Khondab County, Markazi Province, Iran. At the 2006 census, its population was 99, in 25 families.

References 

Populated places in Khondab County